Acianthera alainii is a species of orchid plant native to the Dominican Republic.

References 

alainii
Flora of the Dominican Republic
Plants described in 2016
Flora without expected TNC conservation status